Brianna Kulas (born June 2, 1992) is an American professional women's basketball player originally drafted with the San Antonio Stars of the WNBA in 2014. In her career, Kulas has played for the Kansas State Wildcats, Johnson County Cavaliers and Missouri Tigers. She was cut after attending training.

Biography

Early life 

Kulas was born on June 2, 1992, the daughter of Greg Jordan and Kelly Williams in Shawnee Mission, Kansas. She attended and graduated from Shawnee Mission North High School where she played basketball starting with her freshman year on junior varsity. There she earned a Sporting News honorable-mention All-American honors. Coming off her junior year she committed to Kansas State where she had been offered her only scholarship opportunity.

Playing career 
After a season of receiving limited playing time with the Wildcats, Kulas transferred to Johnson County Community College in 2011. As a sophomore, she led the Cavaliers in scoring and was recognized as an NJCAA Division II All-American. In her two years at Missouri, she led the Tigers in scoring in her junior and senior years and scored over a thousand points overall. In her last season with Missouri, Kulas ranked second in the Southeastern Conference in scoring and led Missouri in scoring in 18 games. Kulas was drafted by the San Antonio Stars in the fourth selection of the third round (28th overall) at the culmination of her final year at Missouri. She was eventually cut by the team after attending training in May.

Kulas signed with CB Islas Canarias of the Liga Femenina de Baloncesto in July 2014.

References 

1992 births
Living people
American women's basketball players
Basketball players from Kansas
Johnson County Community College people
Junior college women's basketball players in the United States
Kansas State Wildcats women's basketball players
Missouri Tigers women's basketball players
People from Johnson County, Kansas
San Antonio Stars draft picks
Valparaiso Beacons women's basketball coaches
Forwards (basketball)